Raja Srimant Ramachandrarao Vitthala Rao Ghorpade CIE (29 March 1850 – 3 December 1892) was a member of the Ghorpade Dynasty who served as the Maharaja of the princely state of Sandur from 1878 to 1892.

Early life 

Ramachandra Vitthala Rao was born on 29 March 1850 in Sanduru to Venkata Rao, the Raja of Sandur, a princely state under the jurisdiction of the Bellary District of the Madras Presidency. Ramachandra Vitthala Rao was educated in private.

Reign 

Ramachandra Vitthala Rao succeeded his brother Shivashanmukha Rao as Raja on 3 May 1878 when the latter died without any offspring. Ramachandra Vitthala Rao celebrated his official coronation on 5 February 1879. In 1882, Ramachandra Vitthala Rao leased 40,000 acres of forests in Sandur state to the Madras government. In September 1885, J. G. Firth a retired tahsildar in Bellary was appointed the Agent of the Madras government to Sandur state. He was subsequently appointed as the first diwan of Sandur. Ramachandra Vitthala Rao was made a Companion of the Order of the Indian Empire in July 1892.

Death 

Ramachandra Vitthala Rao died on 3 December 1892 at Bellary where he had gone for treatment. Ramachandra Vitthala Rao was succeeded by his son Venkata Rao III.

1850 births
1892 deaths
Companions of the Order of the Indian Empire